Řevničov is a municipality and village in Rakovník District in the Central Bohemian Region of the Czech Republic. It has about 1,300 inhabitants.

Notable people
Josef Kadraba (1933–2019), footballer

References

Villages in Rakovník District